Flaming or roasting is the act of posting insults, often including profanity or other offensive language, on the internet. This term should not be confused with the term trolling, which is the act of someone going online, or in person, and causing discord. Flaming emerged from the anonymity that Internet forums provide cover for users to act more aggressively. Anonymity can lead to disinhibition, which results in the swearing, offensive, and hostile language characteristic of flaming. Lack of social cues, less accountability of face-to-face communications, textual mediation and deindividualization are also likely factors. Deliberate flaming is carried out by individuals known as flamers, which are specifically motivated to incite flaming. These users specialize in flaming and target specific aspects of a controversial conversation.

While these behaviors may be typical or expected in certain types of forums, they can have dramatic, adverse effects in others. Flame wars can have a lasting impact on some internet communities where even once a flame war has concluded a division or even dissolution may occur.

The pleasant commentaries within a chat room or message board can be limited by a "war of words" fight or "flaming" with the intent to seek out a negative reaction from the reader. Humphreys defines flaming as "the use of hostile language online, including swearing, insults and otherwise offensive language"etc. Flaming by perpetrators within the online community is commonly received by messaging through text and rarely by face to face or video communication. By basing their conversations on text and not taking full accountability as the "flamer", they have a reduced self-awareness of others feelings, emotions and reactions based on the comments that they provide within the virtual community. The reader now has the perception that this "flamer" is difficult, rude and possibly a bully. The flamer may have limited social cues, emotional intelligence to adapt to others reactions and lack of awareness of how they are being perceived. Their personal social norms, may be considered disrespectful to the reader that has different social norms, education and experience with what is and is not appropriate within virtual communities.

The individuals that create an environment of flaming and hostility, lead the readers to disengage with the offender and may potentially leave the message board and chat room. The continual use of flaming within the online community can create a disruptive and negative experience for those involved and can lead to limited involvement and engagement within the original chat room and program.

Purpose
Social researchers have investigated flaming, coming up with several different theories about the phenomenon. These include deindividuation and reduced awareness of other people's feelings (online disinhibition effect), conformance to perceived norms, miscommunication caused by the lack of social cues available in face-to-face communication, and anti-normative behavior.

Jacob Borders, in discussing participants' internal modeling of a discussion, says:Mental models are fuzzy, incomplete, and imprecisely stated. Furthermore, within a single individual, mental models change with time, even during the flow of a single conversation. The human mind assembles a few relationships to fit the context of a discussion. As debate shifts, so do the mental models. Even when only a single topic is being discussed, each participant in a conversation employs a different mental model to interpret the subject. Fundamental assumptions differ but are never brought into the open. Goals are different but left unstated. It is little wonder that compromise takes so long. And even when consensus is reached, the underlying assumptions may be fallacies that lead to laws and programs that fail. The human mind is not adapted to understanding correctly the consequences implied by a mental model. A mental model may be correct in structure and assumptions but, even so, the human mind—either individually or as a group consensus—is apt to draw the wrong implications for the future.Thus, online conversations often involve a variety of assumptions and motives unique to each individual user. Without social context, users are often helpless to know the intentions of their counterparts. In addition to the problems of conflicting mental models often present in online discussions, the inherent lack of face-to-face communication online can encourage hostility. Professor Norman Johnson, commenting on the propensity of Internet posters to flame one another, states:The literature suggests that, compared to face-to-face, the increased incidence of flaming when using computer-mediated communication is due to reductions in the transfer of social cues, which decrease individuals' concern for social evaluation and fear of social sanctions or reprisals. When social identity and ingroup status are salient, computer mediation can decrease flaming because individuals focus their attention on the social context (and associated norms) rather than themselves.A lack of social context creates an element of anonymity, which allows users to feel insulated from the forms of punishment they might receive in a more conventional setting. Johnson identifies several precursors to flaming between users, whom he refers to as "negotiation partners," since Internet communication typically involves back-and-forth interactions similar to a negotiation. Flaming incidents usually arise in response to a perception of one or more negotiation partners being unfair. Perceived unfairness can include a lack of consideration for an individual's vested interests, unfavorable treatment (especially when the flamer has been considerate of other users), and misunderstandings aggravated by the inability to convey subtle indicators like non-verbal cues and facial expressions.

Factors 
There are multiple factors that play into why people would get involved with flaming. For instance, there is the anonymity factor and that people can use different means to have their identity hidden. Through the hiding of one's identity people can build a new persona and act in a way that they normally would not when they have their identity known. Another factor in flaming is proactive aggression "which is initiated without perceived threat or provocation" and those who are recipients of flaming may counter with flaming of their own and utilize reactive aggression. Another factor that goes into flaming are the different communication variables. For instance, offline communications networks can impact the way people act online and can lead them to engage in flaming. Finally, there is the factor of verbal aggression and how people who engage in verbal aggression will use those tactics when they engage in flaming online.

Flaming can range from subtle to extremely aggressive in online behaviors, such as derogatory images, certain emojis used in combination, and even the use of capital letters. These things can show a pattern of behavior used to convey certain emotions online. Victims should do their best to avoid fighting back in an attempt to prevent a war of words. Flaming extends past social media interactions. Flaming can also take place through emails, and it may not matter so much whether someone calls an email a "flame", is based on whether she or he considers an email to be hostile, aggressive, insulting, or offensive. What matters is how the person receives the interaction. So much is lost in translation when communicating online versus in person, that it is hard to distinguish someone's intent.

History
Evidence of debates which resulted in insults being exchanged quickly back and forth between two parties can be found throughout history. Arguments over the ratification of the United States Constitution were often socially and emotionally heated and intense, with many attacking one another through local newspapers. Such interactions have always been part of literary criticism. For example, Ralph Waldo Emerson's contempt for Jane Austen's works often extended to the author herself, with Emerson describing her as "without genius, wit, or knowledge of the world". In turn, Thomas Carlyle called Emerson a "hoary-headed toothless baboon"

In the modern era, "flaming" was used at East Coast engineering schools in the United States as a present participle in a crude expression to describe an irascible individual and by extension to such individuals on the earliest Internet chat rooms and message boards. Internet flaming was mostly observed in Usenet newsgroups although it was known to occur in the WWIVnet and FidoNet computer networks as well. It was subsequently used in other parts of speech with much the same meaning.

The term "flaming" was seen on Usenet newsgroups in the eighties, where the start of a flame was sometimes indicated by typing "FLAME ON", then "FLAME OFF" when the flame section of the post was complete. This is a reference to both The Human Torch of the Fantastic Four, who used those words when activating his flame abilities, and to the way text processing programs of the time worked, by placing commands before and after text to indicate how it should appear when printed.

The term "flaming" is documented in The Hacker's Dictionary, which in 1983 defined it as "to speak rabidly or incessantly on an uninteresting topic or with a patently ridiculous attitude". The meaning of the word has diverged from this definition since then.

Jerry Pournelle in 1986 explained why he wanted a kill file for BIX:

He added, "I noticed something: most of the irritation came from a handful of people, sometimes only one or two. If I could only ignore them, the computer conferences were still valuable. Alas, it's not always easy to do".

Computer-mediated communication (CMC) research has spent a significant amount of time and effort describing and predicting engagement in uncivil, aggressive online communication. Specifically, the literature has described aggressive, insulting behavior as "flaming", which has been defined as hostile verbal behaviors, the uninhibited expression of hostility, insults, and ridicule, and hostile comments directed towards a person or organization within the context of CMC.

Types

Flame trolling
Flame trolling is the posting of a provocative or offensive message, known as flamebait, to a public Internet discussion group, such as a forum, newsgroup or mailing list, with the intent of provoking an angry response (a "flame") or argument.

Flamebait can provide the poster with a controlled trigger-and-response setting in which to anonymously engage in conflicts and indulge in aggressive behavior without facing the consequences that such behavior might bring in a face-to-face encounter. In other instances, flamebait may be used to reduce a forum's use by angering the forum users. In 2012, it was announced that the US State Department would start flame trolling jihadists as part of Operation Viral Peace.

Among the characteristics of inflammatory behavior, the use of entirely capitalized messages, or the multiple repetition of exclamation marks, along with profanity have been identified as typical.

Flame war
A flame war results when multiple users engage in provocative responses to an original post, which is sometimes flamebait. Flame wars often draw in many users, including those trying to defuse the flame war, and can quickly turn into a mass flame war that overshadows regular forum discussion.

Resolving a flame war can be difficult, as it is often hard to determine who is really responsible for the degradation of a reasonable discussion into a flame war. Someone who posts a contrary opinion in a strongly focused discussion forum may be easily labeled a "baiter", "flamer", or "troll".

Flame wars can become intense and can include "death threats, ad hominem invective, and textual amplifiers,” but to some sociologists flame wars can actually bring people together. What is being said in a flame war should not be taken too seriously since the harsh words are a part of flaming.

An approach to resolving a flame war or responding to flaming is to communicate openly with the offending users. Acknowledging mistakes, offering to help resolve the disagreement, making clear, reasoned arguments, and even self-deprecation have all been noted as worthwhile strategies to end such disputes. However, others prefer to simply ignore flaming, noting that, in many cases, if the flamebait receives no attention, it will quickly be forgotten as forum discussions carry on. Unfortunately, this can motivate trolls to intensify their activities, creating additional distractions.

"Taking the bait" or "feeding the troll" refers to someone who responds to the original message regardless of whether they are aware the original message was intended to provoke a response. Often when someone takes the bait, others will point this out to them with the acronym "YHBT", which is short for "You have been trolled", or reply with "don't feed the trolls". Forum users will usually not give the troll acknowledgement; that just "feeds the troll".

In sociology, history, or any kind of online ethnographic academic study, flame wars as a corpus, in a STS approach of controversies, may be used to understand what is at stake in a community. The idea is that the flame war drives the actors into abandoning a polite stance and forces them to engage into debate and to unveil otherwise concealed arguments. In this respect, the most interesting parts of an online corpus are the flame wars as "outbursts of heated, short and dense debates, in an ocean of evenly distributed polite messages".

Mass flamewar 
A mass flamewar is a flamewar that grows out of a single post or comment into multiple other comments or posts quickly, in the same area where the original post was in. The mass flamewar usually lasts for multiple weeks or months after the first post was posted and died out.

Political flaming 
Political flaming typically occur when people have their views challenged and they seek to have their anger known. Through the covering of one's identity people may be more likely to engage in political flaming. In a 2015 study conducted by Hutchens, Cicchirillo, and Hmielowski, they found that "those who were more experienced with political discussions—either online or offline—were more likely to indicate they would respond with a flame", and they also found that verbal aggression also played a role in a person engaging in political flaming.

Corporate flaming 
Corporate flaming is when a large number of critical comments, usually aggressive or insulting, are directed at a company's employees, products, or brands. Common causes include inappropriate behavior of company employees, negative customer experiences, inadequate care of customers and influencers, violation of ethical principles, along with apparent injustices and inappropriate reactions. Flame wars can result in reputational damage, decreased consumer confidence, drops in stock prices and company assets, increased liabilities, increased lawsuits, and a decrease in customers, influencers and sponsors. Based on an assessment of the damage, companies can take years to recover from a flame war that may detract from their core purpose. Kayser notes that companies should prepare for possible flame wars by creating alerts for a predefined "blacklist" of words and monitoring fast-growing topics about their company. Alternatively, Kayser, points out that a flame war can lead to a positive experience for the company. Based on the content, it could be shared across multiple platforms and increase company recognition, social media fans/followers, brand presence, purchases, and brand loyalty. Therefore, the type of marketing that results from a flame war can lead to higher profits and brand recognition on a broader scale. Nevertheless, it is encouraged that when a company utilizes social media they should be aware that their content could be used in a flame war and should be treated as an emergency.

Examples
Any subject of a polarizing nature can feasibly cause flaming. As one would expect in the medium of the Internet, technology is a common topic. The perennial debates between users of competing operating systems, such as Windows, Classic Mac OS and macOS operating system, or operating systems based on the Linux kernel and iOS or Android operating system, users of Intel and AMD processors, and users of the Nintendo Switch, Wii U, PlayStation 4 and Xbox One video game systems, often escalate into seemingly unending "flame wars", also called software wars. As each successive technology is released, it develops its own outspoken fan base, allowing arguments to begin anew.

Popular culture continues to generate large amounts of flaming and countless flame wars across the Internet, such as the constant debates between fans of Star Trek and Star Wars. Ongoing discussion of current celebrities and television personalities within popular culture also frequently sparks debate.

In 2005, author Anne Rice became involved in a flame war of sorts on the review boards of online retailer Amazon.com after several reviewers posted scathing comments about her latest novel. Rice responded to the comments with her own lengthy response, which was quickly met with more feedback from users.

In 2007, tech expert Kathy Sierra was a victim of flaming as an image of her depicted as a mutilated body was spread around online forums. In addition to the doctored photo being spread virally, her social security number and home address were made public as well. Consequently, Sierra effectively gave up her technology career in response to the ensuing harassment and threats that she received as a result of the flaming.

In November 2007, the popular audio-visual discussion site AVS Forum temporarily closed its HD DVD and Blu-ray discussion forums because of, as the site reported, "physical threats that have involved police and possible legal action" between advocates of the rival formats.

The 2016 Presidential election, saw a flame war take place between Republican candidate Donald Trump and the Democratic candidate Hillary Clinton. The barbs exchanged between the two was highly publicized and is an example of political flaming and a flame war.

Legal implications
Flaming varies in severity and as such so too does the reaction of states in imposing any sort of sanction. Laws vary from country to country, but in most cases, constant flaming can be considered cyber harassment, which can result in Internet Service Provider action to prevent access to the site being flamed. However, as social networks become more and more closely connected to people and their real life, the more harsh words may be considered defamation of the person. For instance, a South Korean Identity Verification law was created to help control flaming and to stop "malicious use of the internet" but opponents to the law argue that the law infringes on the right to free speech.

See also

 Cyberbullying
 Dogpiling
 Eristic
 Forumwarz
 Godwin's law
 "It's okay to be white"
 Internet troll
 Meow Wars
 Smack talk
 Social software
 Spiral of silence on the Internet

References

Further reading

External links
 An Interactional Reconceptualization of "Flaming" and Other Problematic Messages, by Patrick B. O'Sullivan and Andrew J. Flanagin
 FlameWarriors.net
 Older flamebait reference on USENET, 1985 (via Google Groups)
 Flame War Management Handling Crisis in the Social Media Age

Cyberbullying
Internet culture
Internet forum terminology
Internet trolling